is the second studio album by Japanese singer Mari Hamada, released on December 16, 1983 by Invitation. It is the second and final album by Hamada to have the songwriting credited to the Munetaka Higuchi Project Team. The album was reissued alongside Hamada's past releases on January 15, 2014.

Romantic Night peaked at No. 259 on Oricon's albums chart upon its 2008 reissue.

Track listing

Charts

Personnel 
 Kenji Kitajima – guitar
 Hiroaki Matsuzawa – guitar
 Shin Yuasa – guitar
 Hiro Nagasawa – bass
 Yoshihiro Naruse – bass
 Yuki Nakajima – keyboards
 Munetaka Higuchi – drums

References

External links 
  (Mari Hamada)
  (Victor Entertainment)
 
 

1983 albums
Japanese-language albums
Mari Hamada albums
Albums produced by Daiko Nagato
Victor Entertainment albums